Apsilops is a genus of ichneumon wasps in the family Ichneumonidae. There are about nine described species in Apsilops.

Species
These nine species belong to the genus Apsilops:
 Apsilops aquaticus (Thomson, 1874) c g
 Apsilops bicolor (Cushman, 1927) i c g
 Apsilops cinctorius (Fabricius, 1775) c g
 Apsilops hirtifrons (Ashmead, 1896) i c g b
 Apsilops japonicus g
 Apsilops scotinus (Tosquinet, 1903) c g
 Apsilops sericata (Viereck, 1925) i
 Apsilops sericatus (Viereck, 1925) c g
 Apsilops tenebrosus Hellen, 1957 c g
Data sources: i = ITIS, c = Catalogue of Life, g = GBIF, b = Bugguide.net

References

Further reading

 
 

Parasitic wasps
Articles created by Qbugbot